Speedgoat 50k is an international skyrunning competition held for the first time in 2008. It is run every year in Little Cottonwood Canyon (Utah, United States) in July and consists of four races, a 50K, 28K, 11K, and a 2-day challenge.

In 2012, 2013 and 2014 the 50K was valid as Sky Ultra for the Skyrunner World Series. The 50k race features about an elevation ascent of 10,859 feet and descent of 10,512 feet. The race has a minimum base elevation 7,589 feet and a maximum elevation of 10,980 feet. Due to its high altitude, large vertical gain/loss, and technical terrain; the race is regarded as one of the toughest 50ks in the world. The race director is the ultra trail runner Karl Meltzer.

The 2023 race is hosted as part of the UTMB World Series.

Races
 Speedgoat 50K, a Sky Ultra (50 km / 3,660 m D+)
 Speedgoat Vertical Mile, a Vertical Mile (10.3 km 1,645 m D+)

50K

References

External links 
 Official web site

Skyrunning competitions
Skyrunner World Series
Trail running competitions